Kahramanmaraş Archaeology Museum is a museum in Kahramanmaraş, Turkey. The museum is on Azerbeycan Boulevard in Kahramanmaraş.

History
According to the Ministry of Culture and Tourism, even in the Medieval Age during the Dulkadir Beylik there was a primitive museum of steles in the Kahramanmaraş Castle
 During the Republican Age the first museum was established in 1947. In 1961 the museum was transferred to the castle and in 1975 to its present building.

Exhibited items
The items in the museum are from paleolithic, neolithic, chalcolithic, Bronze, Iron, Hellenistic, Roman, Byzantine Ages. The items are exhibited in seven specialized halls; a skeleton of an Anatolian elephant (now extinct from Anatolia), Direkli excavations, Domuztepe excavations,  Hittite items, mosaics, stone tools, chronological archaeology.

References

External links

Buildings and structures in Kahramanmaraş Province
1975 establishments in Turkey
Museums in Turkey
Tourist attractions in Kahramanmaraş Province
Museums established in 1975